Mauro Gabriel Ortiz (born 27 September 1994) is an Argentine professional footballer who plays as a forward for Motagua, on loan from Talleres.

Club career
Ortiz began his senior career in Primera C with Berazategui, he stayed with the club for two seasons and scored ten times in fifty-two appearances. On 6 July 2015, Primera B Metropolitana's Deportivo Riestra signed Ortiz. He scored two goals during his first start on 24 August against Deportivo Español. In 2016–17, Ortiz netted seventeen goals in forty-two fixtures as Deportivo Riestra won promotion to Primera B Nacional. August 2017 saw Ortiz sign for Primera División side Talleres on loan. His first appearance came in a 1–0 loss to Patronato on 1 October, which preceded a further twelve matches in his opening season with them.

In mid-2018, Talleres signed Ortiz permanently. He scored on his next league appearance in August against Gimnasia y Esgrima, before netting again versus Newell's Old Boys in March 2019. The forward didn't feature in the subsequent 2019–20 campaign due to a number of injuries. In February 2022, Ortiz was loaned out to Patronato until the end of 2022. However, the spell was terminated before time, and on 8 August 2022, Ortiz instead joined Hondurian side F.C. Motagua on loan until June 2023.

International career
In 2016, Ortiz was selected by the Argentina U23s for the 2016 Sait Nagjee Trophy. He featured in games against 1860 Munich II and Shamrock Rovers.

Career statistics
.

References

External links

1994 births
Living people
Argentine footballers
Argentine expatriate footballers
Footballers from La Plata
Argentina youth international footballers
Association football forwards
Primera C Metropolitana players
Primera B Metropolitana players
Primera Nacional players
Argentine Primera División players
A.D. Berazategui footballers
Deportivo Riestra players
Talleres de Córdoba footballers
Club Atlético Patronato footballers
F.C. Motagua players
Argentine expatriate sportspeople in Honduras
Expatriate footballers in Honduras